The Petermann Ranges are a mountain range in central Australia.

The range was formed about 550 million years ago during the Petermann Orogeny. The existing geological research has broadly determined that the Petermann Ranges were equivalent in height to the Himalayas.

The Petermanns were named for the geographer August Heinrich Petermann by Ernest Giles, the first European explorer to visit the area, and are commonly associated with the Yurliya ranges, nearby to the west. The area was included in the Katiti-Petermann Indigenous Protected Area in 2012.

In popular culture 
There are few geology-oriented documentaries that trace  Uluru and Kata Tjuta's origins with the Australian Petermann Ranges. The Time Traveller's Guide To Australia (2012) produced by the ABC TV and Essential Media explores the geological origins of the continent.

See also
 Musgrave Ranges
 Olia Chain

References

Mountain ranges of Western Australia
Mountain ranges of the Northern Territory